Ivory Coast competed at the 2014 Summer Youth Olympics, in Nanjing, China from 16 August to 28 August 2014.

Athletics

Ivory Coast qualified one athlete.

Qualification Legend: Q=Final A (medal); qB=Final B (non-medal); qC=Final C (non-medal); qD=Final D (non-medal); qE=Final E (non-medal)

Girls
Track & road events

Judo

Ivory Coast was given a quota to compete by the tripartite committee.

Individual

Team

Taekwondo

Ivory Coast was given a wild card to compete.

Boys

Wrestling

Ivory Coast qualified one athlete based on its performance at the 2014 African Cadet Championships.

Girls

References

2014 in Ivorian sport
Nations at the 2014 Summer Youth Olympics
Ivory Coast at the Youth Olympics